Right to Dream is a Ghanaian football academy. The academy started in 1999 training a small number of boys in Accra and grew into a residential school and training center. As of 2021 it was owned by Mansour Group.

History
Right to Dream Academy was founded in 1999 by Tom Vernon, who had been Manchester United's head scout in Africa. It started on a small scale and, unlike most youth academies, independent of a professional team, training a small number of boys who were initially housed in Vernon's home. Some scouts and other staff were volunteers.

In 2004 the organization began partnering with US boarding high schools to offer athletic scholarships.

In 2010 the organization opened a new facility south of Akosombo in the Eastern Region of Ghana. As of 2021 it is an all-scholarship boarding school for promising footballers drawn from all over West Africa.

Bleacher Report ranked it 15th in their 2013 ranking of youth academies. A girls’ youth system programme was introduced in 2013, the first in Africa. In 2014, Right to Dream Academy launched the first Right to Dream school programme in Takoradi. In 2015 Right to Dream bought FC Nordsjaelland.

As of 2015, partners included Tullow Oil Ghana, Mantrac Ghana, Ashoka, and Laureus Sport For Good Foundation.

In 2021 Mansour Group invested $120 million in a takeover and announced it was forming a new entity, ManSports.

Graduates
Since 1999 the academy has graduated 144 students, according to their website as of 2021.

Since 2007, Right to Dream has produced over 20 graduates playing professional football in Europe. Some Right to Dream graduates have also received call ups into Ghana's National teams, from the Black Starlets(U17) to the Black Stars. As of 2013 Right to Dream had over 30 graduates studying at high schools and universities in the US and UK.

In April 2014, Right to Dream student Fuseina Mumuni was a member of the Ghana U-17 team at the FIFA Women's U-17 World Cup held in Costa Rica.

Tournament play 
Right to Dream squads travel to Europe regularly to compete in tournaments.

Right to Dream U15s won the 26th edition of the Marveld Tournament in the Netherlands The  U15 team of Right to Dream Academy won the 2015 TopC-RKMSV tournament in the Netherlands. The academy participated in the 2013 and 2014 editions of the Gothia Cup, placing third in 2013 and winning in 2014. In 2015, Right to Dream returned to the Gothia Cup and successfully defended their title, making the academy the first team to win the Gothia Tipselit Trophy in two successive years.

The academy has won the African championship and thus retained the right to represent Africa each year since the 2008 edition. Right to Dream has achieved five top-eight finishes in the World Finals of the Manchester United Premier Cup, playing the best football teams from Manchester United, Juventus, Paris Saint Germain and Real Madrid. It placed a best of 3rd in 2009, and in 2014, the academy placed 4th. In 2015, Right to Dream won the Manchester United Premier Cup world finals for the first time in their history.

In 2010, Right To Dream were named Peace Ambassadors and invited to participate in a tournament during that year's Nobel Peace Prize Weekend.

In 2015, Right to Dream U18 and U15 were unbeaten for a combined total of 42 matches on their European Tours.

Programmes 
Scholarships are granted to Africans, both boys and girls, to study at the purpose-built Academy, located on the banks of the Volta River. Every two years, 15–20 students are selected out of 30,000 trialists and assessed both on their athletic ability and their academic performance to study and train at the Academy on 100% scholarships. Right to Dream's International School is an accredited centre for the Cambridge International Examination. The academy also offers a combination of local and international curriculums.

The first Right to Dream School opened in Takoradi in September 2015. The programme is a partnership between Right to Dream and a leading private school in each identified location.

Right to Dream USA is a 501(c)(3) organisation in the United States which places students from Right to Dream Academy into US boarding schools and universities on athletic scholarships.

Notable alumni

Abdul Majeed Waris
Abu Danladi 
Adama Fofana 
Bismark Adjei-Boateng
Clinton Antwi
Collins Tanor 
Daniel Owusu 
David Accam
Divine Naah 
Dominic Oduro 
Edward Opoku
Ema Twumasi 
Emmanuel Boateng 
Emmanuel Ntim 
Enoch Adu
Enock Kwakwa 
Ernest Agyiri
Ernest Nuamah
Evans Mensah 
Fifi Baiden 
Francis Atuahene 
Frank Arhin
Geoffrey Acheampong
George Davies 
Gideon Mensah 
Godfred Saka
Godsway Donyoh 
Haruna Shaibu 
Ibrahim Sadiq 
Isaac Atanga
Joshua Yaro
Kamal Sowah 
Kamaldeen Sulemana 
Keanin Ayer 
Kelvin Boateng 
Kelvin Ofori 
King Osei Gyan 
Kingsley Fobi 
Maxwell Woledzi
Michael Tetteh 
Mohammed Abu
Mohammed Diomande 
Mohammed Kudus 
Oscar Umar 
Ousseni Bouda 
Prince Agyemang
Rashid Nuhu 
Razak Nuhu 
Samuel Mensiro 
Simon Adingra
Tiemoko Fofana 
Thomas Agyepong
Thomas Agyiri
Umar Farouk Osman 
Yaw Yeboah

References

External links
Official Website

 
Football clubs in Ghana
Sport in Accra
Education in Ghana
2000 establishments in Ghana
Football articles needing expert attention